Year 1094 (MXCIV) was a common year starting on Sunday (link will display the full calendar) of the Julian calendar.

Events 
 By place 

 Byzantine Empire 
 Spring – Emperor Alexios I (Komnenos) sends a Byzantine expeditionary force under General Tatikios to Nicaea, in an attempt to re-capture the city from the Seljuk Turks. However, the arrival of Barkiyaruq's army en route stops the Byzantines. Alexios sends reinforcements; short of supplies, the Seljuk Turks retreat. Abu'l-Qasim, Seljuk governor of Nicaea, is defeated and forced to conclude a truce with Alexios.

 Europe 
 May – Rodrigo Diaz de Vivar (El Cid) completes his conquest of Valencia in Al-Andalus (modern Spain). He begins his rule (in the name of King Alfonso VI) of Valencia. The Almoravid campaign to regain the city fails.
 July 28 – William Bertrand dies, and his margravial title of Provence is inherited by Raymond IV (Saint-Gilles), who becomes count of Toulouse (until 1105).

 Scotland 
 May – Duncan II (son of the late King Malcolm III) invades England at the head of an army of Norman knights from Scotland, aided by his half-brother Edmund. He succeeds his uncle, King Donald III (the Fair), as ruler of Scotland.
 November 12 – King Donald III mobilizes his army and kills Duncan II in battle in the Lowlands. He re-takes the Scottish throne, Edmund sides with Donald as co-ruler and is named as heir as he has no children.

 Seljuk Empire 
 Sultan Mahmud I dies after a 2-year reign. He is succeeded by his brother Barkiyaruq (one of the Seljuk prince who claim the throne) as ruler of the Seljuk Empire.

 By topic 

 Religion 
 May 15 – The Cathedral of St. Agatha in Catania (Sicily) is consecrated by the Breton abbot Ansger.
 October 8 – Doge Vitale Faliero consecrates the new Basilica of San Marco in Venice. 
 King Ladislaus I of Hungary founds a diocese (alongside the bishop's see) in Zagreb.

Births 
 January 14 – Eudokia Komnene, Byzantine princess (d. 1129)
 Abd al-Mu'min, Almohad caliph (approximate date)
 Ibn Zuhr (or Avenzoar), Moorish physician (d. 1162)
 Malachy, Irish archbishop and saint (d. 1148)
 Richard d'Avranches, 2nd Earl of Chester (d. 1120)
 Yelü Dashi, founder of the Qara Khitai (d. 1143)

Deaths 
 January 10 – Al-Mustansir Billah, Fatimid caliph (b. 1029)
 February 3 
 Al-Muqtadi, Abbasid caliph (b. 1056)
 Teishi, Japanese empress (b. 1013)
 June 2 – Nicholas the Pilgrim, Italian shepherd (b. 1075)
 June 4 – Sancho V, king of Aragon and Pamplona
 July 28 – William Bertrand, margrave of Provence
 October 14
 Bertha of Holland, French queen 
 Fujiwara no Nobunaga, Japanese nobleman (b. 1022)
 November 12 – Duncan II, king of Scotland
 Abu Ali Fana-Khusrau, Buyid nobleman
 Al-Bakri, Moorish historian and geographer
 Aq Sunqur al-Hajib, Seljuk sultan of Aleppo
 Badr al-Jamali, Fatimid vizier and statesman
 Isaac Albalia, Andalusian Jewish astronomer (b. 1035)
 Jonathan I, Italo-Norman count of Carinola
 Mahmud I, sultan of the Seljuk Empire
 Michael of Avranches, Italian bishop
 Roger de Beaumont, Norman nobleman
 Roger de Montgomery, Norman nobleman
 Terken Khatun, Seljuk empress and regent
 William Fitzeustace, Norman nobleman
 Wulfnoth Godwinson, English nobleman

References